Gun & Goal (2015) is a Punjabi sports drama film, directed by Simranjit Singh Hundal and starring Sumeet Singh Sarao and Rishita Monga. The movie is based on the life of a football player.

Cast

 Sumeet Singh Sarao 
 Rishita Monga 
 Sezal Sharma 
 Sandeepa Virk 
 Razia Sukhbir
 Mukesh Tiwari 
 Guggu Gill 
 Sardar Sohi 
 Surinder Shinda 
 Sanjeev Attri

Soundtrack 

The soundtrack was composed by Jaggi Singh, Onkar Singh, Vivek Kar and Santokh Singh.

References

External links
 
Official Facebook

2015 films
Indian sports comedy films
Films set in India
Films shot in India
Punjabi-language Indian films
2010s Punjabi-language films
Films scored by Vivek Kar